Svein Karl Mønnesland (born 26 October 1943) is a Norwegian Slavist.

He was born in Skien. Since 1979 he teaches as a professor of Slavic languages at the University of Oslo. He is considered an expert in Serbo-Croatian (Bosnian, Croatian and Serbian), and has written numerous books and articles on Serbo-Croatian, Slavic linguistics, literature and cultural history. However, his approach to the South Slavic languages has been met with criticism. He has held a variety of positions, including that of the Nordic representative of the International Committee for Eastern Europe Research and on the Board of the Institute for Comparative Cultural Research. He is a member of the Norwegian Academy of Science and Letters and the Academy of Sciences and Arts of Bosnia and Herzegovina.

Works
 Serbia in the 19th century seen by foreigners. 2016. Novi Sad: Prometej.
 A town in Europe through 2,400 years: Stari Grad (Pharos) on Hvar. Sypress: 2016.
 Lær kroatisk! 2014. Oslo: Sypress.
 National Symbols in Multi-National States. 2013. Oslo: Sypress.
 Bosansko-turski rječnik. Nuhamed Hevai Uskufi. 2012. Tuzla: Općina Tuzla.
 Dalmatia through foreign eyes, 2011. Zagreb: Fidipid.
 Jezik u Bosni i Hercegovini. 2005. Sarajevo: Institut za jezik.
 Bosnisk-kroatisk-serbisk grammatikk. 2002: Sypress.
 1001 days. Bosnia and Herzegovina in pictures and words. 2001. Oslo: Sypress.
 Land ohne Wiederkehr. Ex-Jugoslawien: Die Wurzeln des Krieges. Klagenfurt: Wieder Verlag, 1997.
 Bosnia-Hercegovina. Oslo: Sypress, 1994.
 Kosovo. Oslo: Sypress, 1994.
 Før Jugoslavia, og etter. Oslo: Sypress. 1992 (5. utg. 2006).
 Norsk-bosnisk/kroatisk/serbisk ordbok. Oslo: Universitetsforlaget, 2001.
 Hajdemo u Jugoslaviju. Oslo: Universitetsforlaget, 1986.

Translations
 Jugoslavisk kvartett. Oslo. Samlaget, 1968.
 Nattergal og våpengny. Oslo. Samlaget, 1971.
 Vasko Popa: Den flammende ulvinnen. Solum, 1978.
 Danilo Kiš: Et gravmæle for Boris Davidovits. Aschehoug, 1984.
 Franc Šetinc: Adam Gabrijel. Grøndahl & Søn, 1987.
 Aleksander Tišma: Bruk av mennesket. Gyldendal, 1988.
 Rezak Hukanović: Helvetets tiende port. Sypress: 1993.
 Goran Simić: Sarajevos sorg, Sypress, 1994.
 Aleksander Tišma: Kapo. Gyldendal: 1995
 Nura Bazdulj-Hubiar: Kjærligheten er en sihirbaz. Sypress: 1996.
 Aleksander Tišma: Blams bok, Gyldendal, 1999.
 Aleksander Tišma: Troskap og utroskap. Gyldendal, 2003.
 Munib Delalić: Bare storm og solnedgang tok jeg med fra Hercegovina. Andresen & Butenschøn, 2009.
 Goce Smilevski: Sigmund Freuds søster. Gyldendal, 2013.

References

1943 births
Living people
People from Skien
Slavists
Academic staff of the University of Oslo
Members of the Norwegian Academy of Science and Letters